The Zambia national basketball team represents Zambia in international competitions. It is administrated by the Zambia Basketball Association (ZBA).

Zambia had its best year in 1989 at the FIBA Africa Championship when it finished in Africa's Top Ten, ahead of Kenya.

At the AfroBasket 2017 qualification, Zambia beat South Africa for the first time in history.

Current rosters
Roster for the AfroBasket 2021 qualification matches played on 22–26 January 2020 against Madagascar and Zimbabwe.

Depth chart

Competitive record

AfroBasket
Zambia has successfully qualified for an AfroBasket tournament once, in 1989 when it lost all its five games in Angola and finished in the 10th place.

AfroCan

Head coach position
 Lovemore Sikaale - 2013
 Obed Shamboko - 2017
 Mwape Konsolo - 2020

Past rosters 
Team for the AfroBasket 2013 qualification.

Team for the FIBA AfroBasket 2017 qualifiers.

At the FIBA AfroBasket 2017 qualifiers, Mumba Abraham Mwansa led the team in minutes, rebounds and blocks per game.
Chongo Chona led his team in total points, Simukwela Lishomwa Lubinda led his team in total assists.

See also
 Zambia women's national basketball team
 Zambia national under-19 basketball team
 Zambia national under-17 basketball team
 Zambia national 3x3 team

References

External links
Zambia Basketball Association
Zambia Basketball Records at FIBA Archive
AfroBasket – Zambia Men National Team

 
Men's national basketball teams
1962 establishments in Northern Rhodesia